Lisa Webb GM (née Potts) is a former nursery teacher. On 8 July 1996, her class at St Luke's Primary School in Blakenhall, Wolverhampton, England, was attacked by a man with severe paranoid schizophrenia wielding a machete.

Potts' arm was almost severed in the attack, in which four children were also injured. Potts, who was 21 years old at the time, also suffered severe cuts to her head, back, and to both arms. In 1997, Queen Elizabeth II presented Potts with the George Medal.  Her attacker, Horrett Campbell, was sentenced to indefinite detention in a secure mental hospital.

Potts suffered severe scarring, depression and post-traumatic stress disorder. She was awarded £68,000 compensation more than four years after the attack. The compensation was widely criticised as inadequate, especially by comparison with high libel awards. Potts subsequently worked as a counsellor and, in 2001, founded a charity, Believe To Achieve, based in schools in Wolverhampton. The charity aims to encourage independence and to increase self-esteem in children.

Potts published an autobiography entitled Behind the Smile in 1998. A foreword was contributed by Cherie Blair. Potts went on to study a degree in counselling in 2004. In 2010 she retrained as a nurse at Wolverhampton University and then went on to become a specialist public health nurse.

Earlier in 2022 Potts was made the first Freewoman of the City of Wolverhampton. On 24 July 2022, she participated in the Queen's Baton Relay marking the 2022 Commonwealth Games when it visited Wolverhampton.

Books
Thank You God: Book of Children's Prayers (editor) (1997) Hodder Children's Books, London 
Behind the Smile: My story by Lisa Potts (1998) Hodder & Stoughton, London 
Heroes for a Day (2000) Hodder & Stoughton, London

References

External links
 London Gazette - George Medal citation

Living people
Recipients of the George Medal
People from Wolverhampton
Schoolteachers from the West Midlands
English women non-fiction writers
Women autobiographers
English autobiographers
English nurses
Year of birth missing (living people)